Tally Ho is an Australian brand of cigarette rolling paper distributed by Imperial Tobacco Australia. The packaging of the product asserts that it's Australia's Finest and Australia's No.1 paper for over 60 years despite being made in Belgium.

History 
Tally Ho was founded as an Australia rolling papers company dispite being made in Belgium. The packaging also offers pieces of Australian trivia, such as Australia's dingo fence is twice the length of the Great Wall of China and Australia has more beaches than any other country - about 7,000. In 2015, Tally-Ho was popular in Victorian prisons, despite a smoking ban.

The 2018-2025 Cigarette Rolling Paper Report on Global and United States Market, Status and Forecast, by Players, Types and Applications" research report lists Rizla, Pay-Pay, Zig-Zag, OCB, TOP, Bambú, Bugler, EZ Wider, Export Aquafuge, JOB, Juicy Jay's, Laramie, Raw, Rollies, Swan, Tally-Ho as the "vital supreme players in the worldwide 2018-2025 Cigarette Rolling Paper Report on and the United States market.

See also

List of rolling papers

References

External links
 Rolling Papers.net

Cigarette rolling papers
Pulp and paper companies of Australia
Australian brands
Imperial Brands brands